Malikaa Marathe is a female tennis player of Indian origin. Born in 2003, in Pune she started playing tennis at the age of seven.

Career 
At the age of 4, she was detected with amblyopia, a condition in which the brain prefers the better eye because the nerve development of the defective eye is shut down. She had to wear a patch on her right eye, which was weak for four years until it recovered.

Her coach, Sandeep Kirtane, who happens to be a Davis Cup player recognized her talent. She won her first State Championship in 2013 in the U-10 category. In 2015, she won the National Championship in the U-12 category. She represented India in ITF Asia U-14 and Under Development Championship where she won a gold medal in doubles. In 2017, she qualified for the qualifying Tournament for French Open.

References

2003 births
Living people
Indian female tennis players
People from Pune
Sportspeople from Maharashtra